Arthur Pierce Butler was an American teacher and educational administrator. Butler co-founded the Morristown School (now the Morristown-Beard School) in Morristown, New Jersey, with former Harvard University classmates Francis Woodman and Thomas Quincy Brown.

Early life and education

Butler was born to Edward Knowles Butler and Frances Elizabeth Lewis Pierce on April 21, 1866, in Boston, Massachusetts. He graduated from the Roxbury Latin School in West Roxbury, Massachusetts, in 1884. Butler then received his undergraduate degree from Harvard University in Cambridge, Massachusetts, in 1888. Following his graduation from college, he began working for the Boston Woven Hose and Rubber Company. Butler led the company's branch office in San Francisco and then started their branch office in Chicago.

Teaching career

Butler began his teaching career as an instructor at St. Bartholomew's School in Morristown, New Jersey. After reorganizing St. Bartholomew's School as the Morristown School, he served as an associate headmaster at the school (1898-1917). Upon the retirement of Woodman, Butler served as Morristown School's second headmaster until his retirement in 1926. George Tilghman succeeded him.

Dedication to Allen Keith

On November 27, 1921, a large fire destroyed the Rialto Theatre in New Haven, Connecticut. Allen Keith, a student at Yale University and an alumnus of Morristown School, died while rescuing women and children fleeing the fire. Sharing a tribute to Keith, Butler wrote:

"Though not a brilliant student, his grades were satisfactory. His response to the general school requirements was uniformly credible as shown in punctuality, physical training, and conduct, though there were occasional lapses in the latter quite characteristic of the prankishness of boyhood. Of a gentle and somewhat sensitive disposition, he was only just beginning to find channels for the expression of the more vigorous qualities. When he left Morristown, he was giving promise for good all-round development characteristic of a wholesome, normal boy."

Military career and war service

Butler served with the Morristown Battalion of the New Jersey Militia Reserve. During World War I, he chaired the organization in Monroe, New Jersey, that facilitated Liberty Loans, war bonds that supported military costs.

Family

Butler married Lydia Raquet Farnham on August 8, 1906. They had two children together: Arthur Pierce, Jr. and Edwin Farnham.

References

Schoolteachers from New Jersey
Harvard University alumni
People from Morristown, New Jersey
1866 births
Year of death missing
Place of death missing
Roxbury Latin School alumni